Lone Kroman Petersen (born 19 April 1950) is a Danish equestrian. She competed in the individual jumping event at the 1992 Summer Olympics.

References

External links
 

1950 births
Living people
Danish female equestrians
Olympic equestrians of Denmark
Equestrians at the 1992 Summer Olympics